The Jacquerie was a popular revolt by peasants that took place in northern France in the early summer of 1358 during the Hundred Years' War. The revolt was centred in the valley of the Oise north of Paris and was suppressed after over two months of violence. This rebellion became known as "the Jacquerie" because the nobles derided peasants as "Jacques" or "Jacques Bonhomme" for their padded surplice, called a "jacque". The aristocratic chronicler Jean Froissart and his source, the chronicle of Jean le Bel, referred to the leader of the revolt as Jacque Bonhomme ("Jack Goodfellow"), though in fact the Jacquerie 'great captain' was named Guillaume Cale. The word jacquerie became a synonym of peasant uprisings in general in both English and French.

Background
After the capture of the French king (John II, Froissart's bon roi Jean "good king John") by the English during the Battle of Poitiers in September 1356, power in France devolved fruitlessly among the Estates-General and John's son, the Dauphin, later Charles V.

The Estates-General was too divided to provide effective government and their alliance with King Charles II of Navarre, another claimant to the French throne, provoked disunity amongst the nobles. Consequently, the prestige of the French nobility sank to a new low. The century had begun poorly for the nobles at Courtrai (the "Battle of the Golden Spurs"), where they fled the field and left their infantry to be hacked to pieces; they were also accused of having given up their king at the Battle of Poitiers. The passage of a law that required the peasants to defend the châteaux that were emblems of their oppression was  the immediate cause of the spontaneous uprising. The law was particularly resented as many commoners already blamed the nobility for the defeat at Poitiers. The chronicle of Jean de Venette articulates the perceived problems between the nobility and the peasants, yet some historians, such as Samuel K. Cohn, see the Jacquerie revolts as a reaction to a combination of short- and long-term effects dating from as early as the grain crisis and famine of 1315.

In addition, bands of English, Gascon, German, and Spanish routiers – unemployed mercenaries and bandits employed by the English during outbreaks of the Hundred Years' War – were left uncontrolled to loot, rape, and plunder the lands of northern France almost at will, with the Estates-General powerless to stop them. Many peasants questioned why they should work for an upper class that would not meet its feudal obligation to protect them.

Uprising

This combination of problems set the stage for a brief series of bloody rebellions in northern France in 1358. The uprisings began in a village of St. Leu near the Oise river, where a group of peasants met to discuss their perception that the nobles had abandoned the King at Poitiers. "They shamed and despoiled the realm, and it would be a good thing to destroy them all."

The account of the rising by the contemporary chronicler Jean le Bel includes a description of horrifying violence. According to him,

Examples of violence on this scale by the French peasants are offered throughout the medieval sources, including accounts by Jean de Venette and Jean Froissart, an aristocrat who was particularly unsympathetic to the peasants. Among the chroniclers, the one sympathetic to their plight is Jean de Venette, sometimes (but erroneously) known as the continuator of the chronicle of Guillaume de Nangis.

Jean le Bel speculated that governors and tax collectors spread the word of rebellion from village to village to inspire the peasants to rebel against the nobility. When asked as to the cause of their discontent they apparently replied that they were just doing what they had witnessed others doing. Additionally it seems that the rebellion contained some idea that it was possible to rid the world of nobles. Froissart's account portrays the rebels as mindless savages bent on destruction, which they wrought on over 150 noble houses and castles, murdering the families in horrific ways. The bourgeoisie of Beauvais, Senlis, Paris, Amiens, and Meaux, sorely pressed by the court party, accepted the Jacquerie, and the urban underclass were sympathetic. Village notables often provided leadership for some of the peasant bands, although in letters of pardon issued after the suppression of the rising, such individuals claimed that they were forced to do so.

The Jacquerie must be seen in the context of this period of internal instability. At a time of personal government, the absence of a charismatic king was detrimental to the still-feudal state. The Dauphin had to contend with roaming free companies of out-of-work mercenaries, the plotting of Charles the Bad, and the possibility of another English invasion. The Dauphin gained effective control of the realm only after the supposed surrender of the city of Paris after the murder of the leader of the Estates General Étienne Marcel, prevôt des marchands on 31 July 1358. It is notable that churches were not generally the targets of peasant fury, with the possible exception of some clerics in Champagne.

Suppression

The revolt was suppressed by French nobles and gentry led by the Dauphin and Charles of Navarre, cousin, brother-in-law, and mortal enemy of the Regent, whose throne he was attempting to usurp. His army and the peasant force opposed each other near Mello on 10 June 1358, when Guillaume Cale, the leader of the rebellion, was invited to truce talks by Charles. He went to the enemy camp, where he was seized by the French nobles, who considered that the conventions and standards of chivalry did not apply to him; he was tortured and decapitated. His now leaderless army, claimed to be 100,000 strong in only Froissart's account, which was heavily influenced by the conventions of Romance, was ridden down by divisions of mounted knights. In the ensuing Battle of Mello and in a campaign of terror throughout the Beauvais region, knights, squires, men-at-arms and mercenaries roamed the countryside lynching peasants.

Another major battle transpired at Meaux, where the fortified citadel was crowded with knights and their dependents. On 9 June a band of some 800 armed commoners (not the 10,000 Jacques of Froissart's account) came out of Paris under the leadership of Etienne Marcel to support the rising. When the band from Paris appeared before Meaux they were taken in hospitably by the disaffected townspeople and fed. The fortress, somewhat apart from the town, remained unassailable. Two captain adventurers, returning from crusade against the pagans of Prussia, were at Châlons, Gaston Phebus, comte de Foix and his noble Gascon cousin the Captal de Buch. The approach of their well-armed lancers encouraged the besieged nobles in the fortress, and a general rout of the Parisian force ensued. The nobles then set fire to the suburb nearest the fortress, entrapping the burghers in the flames. The mayor of Meaux and other prominent men of the city were hanged. There was a pause, then the force led by the nobles and gentry plundered the city and churches and set fire to Meaux, which burned for two weeks. They then overran the countryside, burning cottages and barns and slaughtering all the peasants they could find.

The reprisals continued through July and August. Senlis defended itself. Knights of Hainault, Flanders, and Brabant joined in the carnage. Following the declaration of amnesty issued by the Regent on 10 August 1358, such heavy fines were assessed upon the regions that had supported the Jacquerie that a general flight of peasantry ensued. Historian Barbara Tuchman says: "Like every insurrection of the century, it was smashed, as soon as the rulers recovered their nerve, by weight of steel, and the advantages of the man on horseback, and the psychological inferiority of the insurgents".

The slanted but vivid account of Froissart can be balanced by the Regent's letter of general amnesty, a document that comments as severely on the nobles' reaction as on the peasants' rising and omits the atrocities detailed by Froissart: "it represents the men of the open country assembling spontaneously in various localities, in order to deliberate on the means of resisting the English, and suddenly, as with a mutual agreement, turning fiercely on the nobles".

The Jacquerie traumatized the aristocracy. In 1872 Louis Raymond de Vericour remarked to the Royal Historical Society, "To this very day the word 'Jacquerie' does not generally give rise to any other idea than that of a bloodthirsty, iniquitous, groundless revolt of a mass of savages. Whenever, on the Continent, any agitation takes place, however slight and legitimate it may be, among the humbler classes, innumerable voices, in higher, privileged, wealthy classes, proclaim that society is threatened with a Jacquerie".

In the arts
The contemporary literary chronicles were influenced by other medieval genres: romance, satire, and complaint.
The subject of the Jacquerie engaged the Romantic historical imagination, resulting in numerous nineteenth-century historical novels with somewhat operatic plots set against the backdrop of the Jacquerie—The Jacquerie, or, The Lady and the Page: An Historical Romance by G. P. R James (1842) and the like— and even an opera, La jacquerie, by Édouard Lalo.
In Charles Dickens' A Tale of Two Cities, the revolutionaries call themselves "Jacques".
Eugène Sue's novel The Iron Trevet (part of Sue's "Mysteries of the People" sequence) gives a sympathetic account of the Jacquerie rebels.
In Thomas Love Peacock's Crotchet Castle, Dr Folliott compares a local riot with the Jacquerie and expresses nostalgia for "that blessed middle period, after the Jacquerie was down and before the March of Mind was up".
Arthur Conan Doyle's historical novel "The White Company" includes a chapter where the English free company of the title rescue French nobility from peasants of the Jacquerie - portrayed as savage and brutish.
The 1961 novel A Walk with Love and Death by Hans Koningsberger takes place in northern France during the Jacquerie. The revolt provided the basis for a film of the same name directed by John Huston in 1969.
A somewhat fictionalized version of the Jacquerie is featured in the 1962 Blake and Mortimer comic album The Time Trap.
 German progressive rock band Eloy's 1975 concept album Power and the Passion partially takes place in France in 1358 with the Jacquerie being an important part of the story.

Notes

References
J. B. Bury, The Cambridge Medieval History: Decline of Empire and Papacy, Vol. VII. New York: Macmillan Company, 1932.
Samuel K. Cohn, Jr., Popular Protest in Late Medieval Europe. Manchester: Manchester University Press.
Justine Firnhaber-Baker, The Jacquerie of 1358: A French Peasants' Revolt. Oxford: Oxford University Press, 2021.
Jean Froissart. Chronicles. London: Penguin Books, 1978.

Conflicts in 1358
14th-century rebellions
Conflicts of the Hundred Years' War
Popular revolt in late-medieval Europe
1358 in England
1350s in France
Protests in France
Peasant revolts
Rebellions in France
Hundred Years' War, 1337–1360